Varnell is a city in Whitfield County, Georgia, United States. It is part of the Dalton, Georgia Metropolitan Statistical Area. The population was 2,179 at the 2020 census.

History
The Georgia General Assembly incorporated Varnell in 1968. The community was named after M.P. Varnell, a railroad official.

Geography

Varnell is located at  (34.899367, -84.964573).

Demographics

Note: the US Census treats Hispanic/Latino as an ethnic category. This table excludes Latinos from the racial categories and assigns them to a separate category. Hispanics/Latinos can be of any race.

2010 Census
As of the 2010 Census Varnell had a population of 1,744.  The racial and ethnic composition of the population was 83.0% white (74.8% non-Hispanic white), 4.3% black or African American, 0.6% Native American, 1.5% Vietnamese, 1.3% other Asian, 8.0% some other race (0.3% non-Hispanic of some other race) and 1.4% from two or more races.  17.3% of the population was Hispanic or Latino, with the largest portion of that being the 14.0% of the population that was Mexican.

As of the census of 2000, there were 1,491 people, 510 households, and 421 families residing in the city. The racial makeup of the city was 88.73% White, 4.76% African American, 0.07% Native American, 0.40% Asian, 3.55% from other races, and 2.48% from two or more races. Hispanic or Latino of any race were 5.23% of the population.

There were 510 households, out of which 43.7% had children under the age of 18 living with them, 65.7% were married couples living together, 13.1% had a female householder with no husband present, and 17.3% were non-families. 12.9% of all households were made up of individuals, and 3.3% had someone living alone who was 65 years of age or older.  The average household size was 2.92 and the average family size was 3.21.

In the city, the population was spread out, with 30.2% under the age of 18, 9.1% from 18 to 24, 32.9% from 25 to 44, 21.4% from 45 to 64, and 6.4% who were 65 years of age or older.  The median age was 32 years. For every 100 females, there were 92.6 males.  For every 100 females age 18 and over, there were 90.0 males.

The median income for a household in the city was $46,875, and the median income for a family was $48,674. Males had a median income of $34,000 versus $25,216 for females. The per capita income for the city was $18,214.  About 5.8% of families and 6.8% of the population were below the poverty line, including 11.3% of those under age 18 and 15.3% of those age 65 or over.

Education
Varnell is in the Whitfield County School District.

Area schools include:
 Varnell Elementary School
 New Hope Elementary School
 New Hope Middle School

References

Cities in Georgia (U.S. state)
Cities in Whitfield County, Georgia
Dalton metropolitan area, Georgia